Bell Centre is the busiest indoor arena in the province of Quebec, it has been a popular venue for many concerts and other musical events. A list of artists whom have performed concerts at the venue are included in the table below, while non-concert entertainment events are also added. Most shows put on by big acts visit the arena unless they require more room than is available in a hockey rink-sized facility; in which case the Olympic Stadium is used, or less frequently, Parc Jean-Drapeau.

1996–2010

2011–2020

2021–present

References 

Bell Centre